Yanawara (Quechua yana black, wara trousers, "black trousers", Hispanicized spelling Yanahuara)  is a mountain in the Andes of Peru, about  high. It is located in the Arequipa Region, Castilla Province, on the border of the districts Andagua, Ayo and Machaguay. Yanawara lies south-west of P'aqu Urqu and north of Qullpa, Yanqha and Yana Urqu (Quechua for "black mountain", Hispanicized Yana Orcco).

References

Mountains of Peru
Mountains of Arequipa Region